Alishewanella jeotgali is a Gram-negative and facultative anaerobic bacterium from the genus of Alishewanella which has been isolated from gajami sikhae (jeotgal) from Korea.

References

Bacteria described in 2009
Alteromonadales